When the Kite String Pops is the debut album of American heavy metal band Acid Bath. Released on August 8, 1994, it is considered an underground classic, and an early example of sludge metal. The album's artwork is a self-portrait made by notorious serial killer John Wayne Gacy while in prison awaiting execution.

Cover art 
The album's cover art is a painting by John Wayne Gacy named "Skull Clown" in which he depicts himself as his clown alter-ego, "Pogo the Clown". The balloons on the lower part contain both his nickname and his real name, J. W. Gacy.

The use of artwork by a convicted serial killer caused controversy, with Rotten Records president Ron Peterson defending the decision by saying "It's America—you should be able to do what you want". Acid Bath's follow-up album, Paegan Terrorism Tactics continued the provocative streak by using artwork created by euthanasia proponent Jack Kevorkian.

Themes
On the Double Live Bootleg! DVD (2002), vocalist Dax Riggs introduced the song "Tranquilized" by saying, "This song is about getting high any way you do it, and kicking the earth from beneath you" and "Cheap Vodka" by saying, "This song is about getting wasted and killing things, blood, sex, and blasphemy." "Toubabo Koomi" is Swahili for "land of the white cannibals." It was the only Acid Bath song that was made into a music video. According to guitarist Sammy Duet, the alligator which appeared in the video ended up biting someone's face. The song "God Machine" begins with a spoken word introduction by Riggs.

Reception 
In 1999, sales of the album were just over 37,000 copies in the US, which is higher than average for a band with no publicity and released exclusively on an independent label.

Track listing

All songs written and composed by Acid Bath.

Track 14 contains samples from the 1971 Stanley Kubrick film A Clockwork Orange, as well as the 1986 David Lynch film Blue Velvet.

Music videos
"Toubabo Koomi"

Personnel

Acid Bath
Dax Riggs – lead vocals
Mike Sanchez – electric guitar
Sammy "Pierre" Duet – backing vocals, electric guitar
Audie Pitre – backing vocals, bass guitar
Jimmy Kyle – drums, percussion

Production
Acid Bath - production
Spike Cassidy - production, engineer, mixer, mastering 
Greg Troyner - production, engineer, mixer
Eddie Schreyer - mastering
Mike Wasco - photography

References 

1994 debut albums
Dax Riggs albums
Acid Bath albums
John Wayne Gacy
Obscenity controversies in music